Dans la Nuit may refer to:

Dans la nuit (film), a 1929 film by Charles Vanel
Dans la Nuit (album), a 2000 album by Louis Sclavis
"Dans la nuit", a song by Reynaldo Hahn
"Dans la Nuit", a 1966 song by Chantal Goya
"Dans la Nuit", a 1964 tune by Jacques Denjean et Son Orchestre